Eastland High School is a public high school located in Eastland, Texas, United States and classified as a 3A school by the University Interscholastic League (UIL).  It is part of the Eastland Independent School District located in north central Eastland County. In 2015, the school was rated "Met Standard" by the Texas Education Agency.

Demographics
The demographic breakdown of the 317 students enrolled for 2012-2013 was:
Male - 55.2%
Female - 44.8%
Native American/Alaskan - 0.6%
Asian/Pacific islanders - 0.3%
Black - 1.6%
Hispanic - 23.0%
White - 73.9%
Multiracial - 0.6%

In addition, 46.4% of the students were eligible for free or reduced lunch.

Athletics
The Eastland Mavericks compete in the following sports - 

Cross Country, Volleyball, Football, Basketball, Golf, Tennis, Track, Softball & Baseball

State Titles
Football - 
1982(2A)

References

External links

Eastland ISD

Public high schools in Texas
Schools in Eastland County, Texas